Puru River may refer to:

 Izvorul Purului, tributary of the Lotru in Vâlcea County, Romania
 Puru, tributary of the Vaser in Maramureș County, Romania